Jomboy is a city in Samarqand Region, Uzbekistan. It is the capital of Jomboy District. The town population was 11,308 people in the year 1989, and 17,400 in 2016.

References

Populated places in Samarqand Region
Cities in Uzbekistan